Marco Thiede (born 20 May 1992) is a German professional footballer who plays for Karlsruher SC. He plays as a right midfielder or as a right back.

External links

1992 births
Living people
Sportspeople from Augsburg
Association football fullbacks
Association football midfielders
German footballers
FC Augsburg players
FC Augsburg II players
SV Sandhausen players
Karlsruher SC players
Karlsruher SC II players
2. Bundesliga players
3. Liga players
Regionalliga players
Footballers from Bavaria